Enniskillen (from  , 'Ceithlenn's island') is the largest town in County Fermanagh, Northern Ireland. It is in the middle of the county, between the Upper and Lower sections of Lough Erne. It had a population of 13,823 at the 2011 Census. Enniskillen Castle was built in the 15th century as a stronghold of the Maguires, before coming under English control in the early 17th century. The castle and town were expanded during the Plantation of Ulster. It was the seat of local government for the former Fermanagh District Council, and is the county town of Fermanagh.

Toponymy
This refers to Cethlenn, a figure in Irish mythology who may have been a goddess. Local legend has it that Cethlenn was wounded in battle by an arrow and attempted to swim across the River Erne, which surrounds the island, but she never reached the other side, so the island was named in reference to her. It has been anglicised many ways over the centuries – Iniskellen, Iniskellin, Iniskillin, Iniskillen, Inishkellen, Inishkellin, Inishkillin, Inishkillen and so on.

History 

The town's oldest building is Enniskillen Castle, built by Hugh (Maguire) the Hospitable who died in 1428. An earthwork, the Skonce on the shore of Lough Erne, may be the remains of an earlier motte. The castle was the stronghold of the junior branch of the Maguires. The first watergate was built around 1580 by Cú Chonnacht Maguire, though subsequent lowering of the level of the lough has left it without water. The strategic position of the castle made its capture important for the English in 1593, to support their plans for the control of Ulster. The castle was besieged three times in 1594–95. The English, led by a Captain Dowdall, captured it in February 1594. Maguire then laid siege to it, and defeated a relieving force at the Battle of the Ford of the Biscuits at Drumane Bridge on the Arney River. Although the defenders were relieved, Maguire gained possession of the castle from 1595 to 1598 and it was not finally captured by the English until 1607.

This was part of a wider campaign to bring the province of Ulster under English control; the final capture of Enniskillen Castle in 1607 was followed by the Plantation of Ulster, during which the lands of the native Irish were seized and handed over to planters loyal to the English Crown. The Maguires were supplanted by William Cole, originally from Devon, who was appointed by James I to build an English settlement there in 1612.

Captain Cole was installed as Constable and strengthened the castle wall and built a "fair house" on the old foundation as the centre point of the county town. The first Protestant parish church was erected on the hilltop in 1627. By 1630 the town had around 180 inhabitants, mostly comprising English and Scottish settlers. The Royal Free School of Fermanagh was moved onto the island in 1643. The first bridges were drawbridges; permanent bridges were not installed before 1688.

By 1689 the town had grown significantly. During the conflict which resulted from the ousting of King James II by his Protestant rival, William III, Enniskillen and Derry were the focus of Williamite resistance in Ireland, including the nearby Battle of Newtownbutler.

Enniskillen and Derry were the two garrisons in Ulster that were not wholly loyal to James II, and it was the last town to fall before the siege of Derry. As a direct result of this conflict, Enniskillen developed not only as a market town but also as a garrison, which became home to two regiments.

The current site of Fermanagh College (now part of the South West College) was the former Enniskillen Gaol.  Many people were tried and hanged in the square during the times of public execution. Part of the old Gaol is still used by the college. Enniskillen Town Hall was designed by William Scott and completed in 1901.

Military history 

Enniskillen is the site of the foundation of two British Army regiments:
 Royal Inniskilling Fusiliers
 The Inniskillings (6th Dragoons)

The town's name (with the archaic spelling) continues to form part of the title to The Royal Irish Regiment (27th (Inniskilling) 83rd and 87th and Ulster Defence Regiment). Enniskillen Castle features on the cap badge of both regiments.

The Troubles 

Enniskillen was the site of several events during The Troubles, the most notable being the Remembrance Day bombing in which 11 people were killed. Bill Clinton opened The Clinton Centre in 2002 on the site of the bombing. The Provisional Irish Republican Army claimed responsibility for the attack.

Alleged sexual abuse and assault 
In 2019, at least nine men reported to the police and the press and said in public forums that, in the 1980s and 90s, when they were children, they were repeatedly molested and raped by a paedophile ring of at least 20 men in the Enniskillen area.  Investigations are continuing.

Miscellaneous 
 The Enniskillen Dragoon is a famous Irish folk song associated with the Inniskilling Dragoons Regiment. Tommy Makem wrote additional verses and renamed the song Fare Thee Well, Enniskillen.
 The Chieftains sing a song that mentions Enniskillen titled "North Amerikay".
 Jim Kerr of Simple Minds was so moved by the horror of the Enniskillen bombing in 1987 that he wrote new words to the traditional folk song "She Moved Through The Fair" and the group recorded it with the name "Belfast Child". The recording reached No. 1 in the UK Charts, Ireland and several other countries in 1989. The single was taken from the album Street Fighting Years; the single version was released on the "Ballad of the Streets" EP. The video of the song was shot in black and white and displays poignant footage of children and the destruction of the bombing.  Similarly, U2 held a concert the same day as the bombing; during a performance of their song "Sunday Bloody Sunday", singer Bono passionately condemned the bombing, stating "fuck the revolution" in his mid-song speech. The footage is included in U2's rockumentary Rattle and Hum.
 Neil Hannon also mentions Enniskillen in his song "Sunrise".
 Bill Fay also mentions Enniskillen in his song In Human Hands.
 The Guardian noted that residential areas including Cooper Crescent and Chanterhill Road - inner suburbs just North of the town centre - were the 'poshest' with much of the fine housing stock located outside of the town centre.
 The Irish language novel Mo Dhá Mhicí by Séamus Mac Annaidh is set in Enniskillen.

Demography 
On Census day (27 March 2011) there were 13,823 people living in Enniskillen (5,733 households), accounting for 0.76% of the NI total and representing an increase of 1.6% on the Census 2001 population of 13,599. Of these:

 19.76% were aged under 16 years and 15.59% were aged 65 and over;
 51.80% of the usually resident population were female and 48.20% were male;
 61.62% belong to or were brought up in the Catholic Christian faith and 33.55% belong to or were brought up in various 'Protestant and Other Christian (including Christian related)' denominations
 35.59% indicated that they had a British national identity, 33.77% had an Irish national identity and 30.35% had a Northern Irish national identity (respondents could indicate more than one national identity)
 39 years was the average (median) age of the population
 13.03% had some knowledge of Irish (Gaelic) and 3.65% had some knowledge of Ulster-Scots

Climate 
Enniskillen has a maritime climate with a narrow range of temperatures and rainfall.

The respective absolute maximum for St Angelo is 

Lough Navar is a frosty location, with some 76 air frosts recorded in a typical year. It is likely that Enniskillen town centre is significantly less frosty than this.

Rainfall is high, averaging over 1500 mm. 212 days of the year report at least 1 mm of precipitation, ranging from 15 days during April, May and June, to 20 days in October, November, December, January and March.

The Köppen climate classification subtype for this climate is "Cfb" (Marine West Coast Climate/Oceanic climate).

Places of interest

Churches
There are four churches in the town centre. These are:
 St. Macartin's Cathedral (Church of Ireland) - This church dates from 1840. It was built on the site of an earlier Plantation church.
 St. Michael's Church (Catholic) - This church dates from 1875 although an earlier church on the site dates from 1803.
 Enniskillen Methodist Church - This church opened in 1867. It has a Palladian facade. 
 Enniskillen Presbyterian Church - The current church was erected in 1897 although there is evidence of a building dating back to 1700.
There are several other churches outside the town centre.

Historic Buildings
Some of these buildings are outside the town.
 Castle Coole
 Colebrooke House, Brookeborough - eleven miles east of Enniskillen; built 1820
 Cole's Monument
 Enniskillen Castle
 Enniskillen Town Hall
 Enniskillen Courthouse - built 1785
 Florence Court - eight miles outside Enniskillen; 18th century 
 Monea Castle
 Portora Castle 
 The Regimental Museum of the Inniskilling Regiment

Natural Phenomena
 The Marble Arch Caves
 Cuilcagh Mountain Global Geo-Park
 Lough Navar and the Cliffs of Magho

Other
 Ardhowen Theatre
 The Clinton Centre
 The Round O
 William Blake's pub - historic public house

Sports

Association football

The town has two association football teams called Enniskillen Rangers and Enniskillen Town United F.C.

Enniskillen Rangers are the current holders of the Irish Junior Cup, defeating Hill Street 5–1 on Monday, 1 May 2017. The match was played at the National Football Stadium at Windsor Park in Belfast. They play their home games at the Ball Range.

Enniskillen Rangers have several notable former players including Sandy Fulton and Jim Cleary.

Enniskillen Town United F.C. currently play in the Fermanagh & Western 1st Division. Their most notable former player is Michael McGovern who currently plays for Norwich City F.C. At the moment, Enniskillen Town play their home games at The Lakeland Forum playing fields in Enniskillen.

Rugby

Enniskillen Rugby Football Club was founded in 1925 and plays its home games at Mullaghmeen. The club currently fields 4 senior men's teams, a senior ladies' team, a range of male and female youth teams, a vibrant mini section and a disability tag team called The Enniskillen Elks. Enniskillen XV won the Ulster Towns Cup in the 2018/19 season, defeating Ballyclare 19–0. The team currently play in Kukri Ulster Rugby Championship Division 1.

The rugby club was formed on 28 August 1925, when 37 attended a meeting in Enniskillen Town Hall. The name Enniskillen Rugby Club was agreed and the club adopted the rules of the Dublin University Football Club. The first match was played on 30 September 1925 against Ballyshannon in County Donegal.

Gaelic games

Enniskillen Gaels is a Gaelic Athletic Association club founded in 1927. It is based at Brewster Park, Enniskillen. The club has had success in both Gaelic football and hurling winning in both county and provincial competitions.

International events 
Enniskillen was the venue of the 39th G8 summit which was held on 17 and 18 June 2013. It was held at the Lough Erne Resort, a five-star hotel and golf resort on the shore of Lough Erne. The gathering was the biggest international diplomatic gathering ever held in Northern Ireland. Among the G8 leaders who attended were British Prime Minister David Cameron, United States President Barack Obama, German Chancellor Angela Merkel, and Russian President Vladimir Putin.

In the past, Enniskillen has hosted an array of international events, most notably stages of the World Waterski World Cup, annually from 2005 to 2007 at the Broadmeadow. Despite its success, Enniskillen was not chosen as a World Cup Stop for 2008.

In January 2009, Enniskillen hosted the ceremonial start of Rally Ireland 2009, the first stage of the WRC FIA World Rally Championship 2009 Calendar.

Enniskillen has hosted the Happy Days arts festival since 2012, which celebrates "the work and influence of Nobel Prize-winning writer Samuel Beckett" and is the "first annual, international, multi-arts festival to be held in Northern Ireland since the launch of the Ulster Bank Belfast Festival at Queen's in 1962".

Notable natives and residents

Arts and Media
 Samuel Beckett, playwright, educated at Portora Royal School
 Nathan Carter, singer
 Charles Duff, Irish author of books on language learning and other subjects
 Adrian Dunbar, actor, born and brought up in Enniskillen
 Nial Fulton, film and television producer, educated at Portora Royal School
 Neil Hannon, lead singer/composer of the pop band The Divine Comedy, educated at Portora Royal School
 Charles Lawson, most notable for playing Jim McDonald in Coronation Street
 Lisa McHugh, country music singer; born in Glasgow, Scotland, she moved to Enniskillen as an adult.
 Fearghal McKinney, journalist, former UTV broadcaster and member of the Northern Ireland Assembly
 Nigel McLoughlin, poet, editor of Iota poetry journal and Professor of Creativity and Poetics, University of Gloucestershire
 Ciarán McMenamin, television actor and author
 Frank Ormsby, poet
 David Robinson, photographer and publisher, educated at Portora Royal School
 William Scott, artist
 Mick Softley singer and songwriter for Bob Dylan and Donovan, lived in the town at the time of his death
 Joan Trimble, pianist and composer
 Oscar Wilde, satirist and playwright, educated at Portora Royal School
 Ron Wilson, a news anchor with Network Ten in Australia

Business
 James Gamble, co-founder of Procter & Gamble, educated at Portora Royal School

Medicine and Science
 Denis Burkitt, FRS, surgeon and epidemiologist

Military
 Eric Bell, recipient of the Victoria Cross
 Henry Hartigan, recipient of the Victoria Cross
 James McGuire, recipient of the Victoria Cross
 George Nurse, recipient of the Victoria Cross

Politics
 Gerald Grosvenor, 6th Duke of Westminster, brought up at the family's estate at Ely Lodge
 Gordon Wilson, Irish senator and peace campaigner, who lived on Cooper Crescent

Religion
 Edward Cooney, evangelist and early leader of the Cooneyite and Go-Preacher sects, educated at Portora Royal School
 Edward Kernan, a Roman Catholic bishop
 Henry Francis Lyte, hymn composer, most notably of "Abide with Me", educated at Portora Royal School
 John McElroy (1782–1877), Jesuit priest, founder of Boston College

Sports
 Declan Burns, Irish kayaking athlete, three-time Irish Olympic representative and former World Superstars runner-up
 Roy Carroll, goalkeeper who plays for Dungannon Swifts F.C. and who has been capped by Northern Ireland
 Harry Chatton, football player, from the 1920s and 1930s, who was a dual international for both the IFA and FAI Irish international teams
 Jim Cleary, former Glentoran footballer and member of Northern Ireland's 1982 World Cup squad
 William Emerson, football player who won 11 caps for Ireland between 1919 and 1923
 Gordon Ferris, Northern Irish former heavyweight boxer who was both Irish and British champion in the early 1980s
 Frank Hoy, professional wrestler, was born in the town
 Robert Kerr, Olympic 100m gold medalist in the 1908 Olympics for Canada
 Kyle Lafferty, striker, professional football player for Anorthosis Famagusta FC and Northern Ireland international
 Andrew Little, former professional football player and Northern Ireland international, educated at Portora Royal School
 Michael McGovern, Northern Ireland international goalkeeper, currently with Norwich City F.C.
 Gavin Noble, Irish international triathlete, educated at Portora Royal School
 Dick Rowley, football player who won six caps for Ireland between 1929 and 1931

Education 

There are numerous schools and colleges in and around the Enniskillen area, from primary level to secondary level, including some further education colleges such as the technical college.

Primary level 
 Enniskillen Integrated Primary school
 Model primary school
 Holy Trinity Primary School
 Jones Memorial Primary School
 Mullnaskea Primary School

Secondary level 
 Erne Integrated College
 Devenish College
 Enniskillen Royal Grammar School
 Mount Lourdes Enniskillen; convent girls grammar school
 St Michael's College; boys grammar school
 St Fanchea's College
 St Joseph's College

Colleges 
 Enniskillen Campus of the College of Agriculture, Food and Rural Enterprise (CAFRE)
 Enniskillen Campus South West College

Transport

Rail – historic 
Railway lines from Enniskillen railway station linked the town with Derry from 1854, Dundalk from 1861, Bundoran from 1868 and Sligo from 1882. By 1883 the Great Northern Railway (Ireland) absorbed all the lines except the Sligo, Leitrim and Northern Counties Railway, which remained independent throughout its existence. In October 1957 the Government of Northern Ireland closed the GNR line, which made it impossible for the SL&NCR to continue and forced it also to close.

Rail – current 
The nearest railway station to Enniskillen is Sligo station which is served by multiple trains to Dublin Connolly and is operated by Iarnród Éireann. The Dublin-Sligo railway line has a two-hourly service run by Iarnród Éireann. A connecting bus from Sligo via Manorhamilton to Enniskillen is operated by Bus Éireann.

Bus 
Bus service to Enniskillen is provided by both Ulsterbus and Bus Éireann, from Enniskillen bus station. Number 261, 261b and X261 Goldline buses run from Belfast to Enniskillen. Bus Éireann Route 30 runs from Donegal to Dublin Airport/Dublin City via Enniskillen.

Air 
Enniskillen has a World War II-era airport, Enniskillen/St Angelo Airport. The airport had scheduled flights in the past but now serves mainly private traffic.

Road 
The town is on the main A4/N16 route linking Belfast and Sligo, and on the main Dublin to Ballyshannon route, the N3/A46/A509.

Twinning 
Enniskillen was originally twinned with Brackwede – a Bielefeld suburb – where the Inniskilling Dragoon Guards were stationed in the late 1950s when the twinning was initiated; however, this suburb was incorporated into Stadt Bielefeld in 1973, the city with which Enniskillen is now officially twinned.

Though the twinning arrangements are still operational, at a meeting of the Regeneration and Community Committee, in February 2018, it was agreed that the twinning arrangements would be formally terminated at the end of the Council term in June 2018. However, Fermanagh and Omagh District Council still have plans to send representatives to Brackwede for the 60th-anniversary celebrations of the twinning. Therefore, the future of the twinning is now somewhat unclear.

See also 
 List of civil parishes of County Fermanagh
 List of localities in Northern Ireland by population

References

External links 

 Enniskillen.Com
  BBC short on Enniskillen's forgotten streets.

 
Towns in County Fermanagh 
County towns in Northern Ireland
Towns with cathedrals in the United Kingdom
Civil parishes of County Fermanagh
Former boroughs in Northern Ireland